Fala is a settlement on the Drava River in Slovenia. The settlement on the left bank of the river belongs to the Municipality of Selnica ob Dravi and the remainder of the settlement on the right bank of the river belongs to the Municipality of Ruše.

Name
Fala was mentioned in written sources in 1245 as in domo Volmari (and as de Valle in 1279, Vall and Valle in 1289, and Fall in 1495). The name is of unclear origin, although the initial F- indicates a German origin. It could be derived from Old High German falo 'yellowish' (referring to soil or water color) or from valle 'trap' (referring to hunting activity).  Derivation from Latin vallis 'valley' is unlikely because the area was not under Romance influence.

History
The settlement was historically a property of Fala Castle, on the opposite side of the river.

Notable people
Notable people that were born or lived in Fala include:
Miloš Štibler (1882–1969), social activist
Alojz Šušmelj (1913–1942), painter

References

External links
Fala, Selnica ob Dravi on Geopedia

Populated places in the Municipality of Selnica ob Dravi